Johnathan Paul Manziel (born December 6, 1992) is an American football quarterback for the Zappers of Fan Controlled Football (FCF). He played two seasons with the Cleveland Browns of the National Football League (NFL) and was also a member of the Canadian Football League's (CFL) Hamilton Tiger-Cats and Montreal Alouettes in 2018 and the Alliance of American Football's (AAF) Memphis Express in 2019.

Manziel was nationally recruited out of high school as a dual-threat quarterback, and he debuted for the Texas A&M Aggies as a redshirt freshman in Kevin Sumlin's Air Raid offense during A&M's first season in the Southeastern Conference (SEC) in 2012. He broke numerous NCAA Division I FBS and SEC records, which included becoming the first freshman and fifth player in NCAA history to pass for 3,000 yards and rush for 1,000 yards in a season. At the end of the regular season, he became the first freshman to win the Heisman Trophy, Manning Award, and the Davey O'Brien National Quarterback Award. Manziel capitalized on his redshirt freshman season by leading Texas A&M to a 41–13 victory over Oklahoma in the Cotton Bowl.

Manziel was drafted by the Browns as the 22nd overall pick of the 2014 NFL Draft. Despite some success, he struggled with consistency and his tenure was overshadowed by off-field controversies. He was released by the Browns after the end of the 2015 season. Following further controversies during the 2016 offseason, Manziel was not signed by another team before the start of the season and spent two years away from football until he returned with the Canadian Football League’s Tiger-Cats in 2018. He was later traded to the Alouettes during the season, but was released the following year and rendered ineligible to play in the CFL after it was determined he violated the terms of his contract. Shortly after his release, Manziel signed with the Express during the AAF's inaugural season, which was cut short when the AAF suspended operations two weeks later.

TexAgs users tagged Manziel with the nickname "Johnny Football" during Manziel's sophomore high school football season in Texas. The nickname followed him to Texas A&M University. Manziel applied for and was granted a registered trademark for the nickname in 2013.

Manziel was inducted into the Texas A&M Athetics Hall of Fame in September 2022.

Early life
Manziel was born in Tyler, Texas, on December 6, 1992, to Michelle (née Liberato) and Paul Manziel. He has a younger sister named Meri.

Manziel's paternal great-great-grandfather Joseph immigrated to the United States, in 1907, from Lebanon and settled in Louisiana. He is of Italian descent on his maternal side.

Manziel grew up playing a variety of sports, including football, basketball, baseball, and golf. At Tivy High School in Kerrville, Texas, he focused on baseball and football. However, in football, sportswriters, coaches, and parents said he "achieved folk hero status" and was compared to quarterbacks like Brett Favre, Michael Vick, and Drew Brees.

High school career
At Tivy High School, Manziel played football for four years, beginning with the freshman team in his first year. By the end of his first season, he played with the varsity team as a receiver. He began his sophomore year primarily as a receiver, but started the fourth game at quarterback. He shared that position for the remainder of the season, finishing with 1,164 yards passing, 806 rushing and 408 receiving for a combined 28 touchdowns. His junior year was his first as starting quarterback, and he completed that season with 2,903 passing yards, 1,544 rushing yards, 152 receiving yards and 55 touchdowns. That year, he was voted All-San Antonio Area Offensive Player of the Year as well as District 27-4A MVP.

During Manziel's senior season, he compiled 228-of-347 (65.7%) passing for 3,609 yards with 45 touchdowns and five interceptions. He also had 170 carries for 1,674 yards and 30 touchdowns. He had one touchdown reception and returned a kickoff for a touchdown for a combined 77 touchdowns. That year, he was honored as District 28-4A MVP (unanimous selection), Class 4A First-team All-State (AP), San Antonio Express-News Offensive Player of the Year (second year in a row), the Associated Press Sports Editors Texas Player of the Year, Sub-5A First-team All-Area (SA Express-News), No. 1 QB in Texas by Dave Campbell's Texas Football, DCTF Top 300, PrepStar All-Region and Super-Prep All-Region.

For Manziel's three years as a starter, he completed 520-of-819 passes (63.5%) for 7,626 yards and 76 touchdowns, rushed 531 times for 4,045 yards and 77 touchdowns and caught 30 passes for 582 yards and another five touchdowns. He was the only quarterback in America named as a Parade All-American his senior year, and he was also named The National High School Coaches Association (NHSCA) Senior Athlete of the Year in football. He won the Mr. Texas Football award in 2010.

Manziel was highly recruited out of high school; in addition to Texas A&M, he received offers from Baylor, Colorado State, Iowa State, Louisiana Tech, Oregon, Rice, Stanford, Tulsa, and Wyoming. Although he grew up a Texas Longhorns fan, the University of Texas did not recruit him. Although it was rumored that Texas wanted Manziel at defensive back, Texas coach Mack Brown said the rumor was not true. Though Manziel originally committed to play for Oregon, he later changed his commitment to the Aggies, thanks to the influence of then-quarterbacks coach Tom Rossley.

High school statistics

Manziel was named to the NUC All World Game (started by David Schuman and National Underclassmen Combine) in 2010 where he rushed for over 100 yards and threw for over 200. It was the first time Manziel dominated on a national stage. He played in the game as a teammate with Oregon QB Marcus Mariota.

College career

Manziel received an athletic scholarship to attend Texas A&M University, where he attended under coach Mike Sherman in 2011 and played for new coach Kevin Sumlin from 2012 to 2013.

Manziel was redshirted during the 2011 season and did not play in any games. He made the travel squad after enrolling with the college in January.

2012 season

Texas A&M faced uncertainty at the quarterback position when Ryan Tannehill left for the National Football League after the 2011 season. Manziel performed well during spring ball and fall practices and won the starting job over Jameill Showers and Matt Joeckel before the season began. His first game was supposed to be against Louisiana Tech in Shreveport, Louisiana on Thursday, August 30, 2012, but the game was postponed until October 13 due to Hurricane Isaac hitting the Louisiana coast two days prior to game time. Consequently, Manziel's college football debut was played as a redshirt freshman against the Florida Gators before a home crowd at Kyle Field.

Although Manziel began the season in relative obscurity, his play against Arkansas in which he broke Archie Manning's 43-year-old total offense record gained him some attention. Manziel produced 557 yards of total offense, breaking Manning's record of 540. Two games later, Manziel surpassed his own total offense record against No. 24 Louisiana Tech by achieving 576 yards of total offense, becoming the first player in SEC history to have two 500+ total offense games in one season. After Texas A&M's blowout of Auburn in the eighth game of the season, in which Manziel accounted for three passing and two rushing touchdowns through only the first half plus one series in the second, Manziel began showing up in national Heisman Watch lists.

Manziel was launched into the national scene after he led Texas A&M to a 29–24 victory over No. 1 Alabama in Tuscaloosa. In that game, Manziel accounted for 345 of A&M's 418 yards of offense, including two passing touchdowns. In the following days, Manziel became the frontrunner for the Heisman Trophy in most national watch lists and polls due to his performance during the game combined with other Heisman frontrunners faltering.

On November 24, during the game against the Missouri Tigers before a home crowd, Manziel left the game with an apparent knee injury late in the first quarter. He returned to the field for the next series of downs wearing a knee brace and finished the game with 439 yards of total offense, including three passing and two rushing touchdowns. During the game, he broke the single-season record for offensive production in the SEC with 4,600 yards, surpassing Cam Newton and Tim Tebow, notable recent Heisman Trophy winners. He also became the first freshman and only the fifth player in NCAA history to pass for 3000 and rush for 1,000 yards in a season, reaching that mark two games earlier than any other player. He won the SEC Freshman of the Year Award and College Football Performance National Freshman of the Year Award. Manziel won the Davey O'Brien Award on December 6 and the Heisman Trophy on December 8, making him the first freshman ever to win either award.

2013 season
Texas A&M started the 2013 season with a No. 6 ranking in the Coaches Poll. Prior to the season, some journalists argued that Manziel could suffer a sophomore slump, while others felt that he would continue to have success. Manziel's eligibility for the 2013 season was under question after reports surfaced that he had signed autographs for money in January 2013. On August 28, 2013, the NCAA reached an agreement with Texas A&M to suspend Manziel for the first half of the team's game against Rice (the first game of the season), after acknowledging that Manziel did not receive any money for the autographs.

In the game against No. 1 Alabama, Manziel threw for a school record of 464 yards and five touchdowns in the 49–42 loss. His primary target during the game was Mike Evans, who compiled seven receptions for a school record of 279 yards. In the 51–41 win over Mississippi State, Manziel tied his single-game career-high five touchdowns, while also throwing for 446 yards but with three interceptions. He was fifth in Heisman Trophy voting in 2013.

College statistics

Baseball
As a Texas Rangers fan growing up, Manziel was a middle infielder at Tivy High School before forgoing his baseball career in favor of football. He played baseball through his junior year, but he skipped out on his senior season so he could graduate early and focus on preparing for his freshman football season at Texas A&M. Manziel's passion for the game of baseball, however, did not diminish after high school. He briefly discussed the possibility of playing collegiate ball with Texas A&M's baseball coaches, but that never came to fruition once he won the starting quarterback job as a redshirt freshman.

In the 2014 Major League Baseball draft, Manziel was drafted in the 28th round (837th overall pick) by the San Diego Padres as a shortstop.

Professional football career

In January 2014, Manziel announced that he would forgo his junior season and enter the 2014 NFL Draft. He was projected to be a first-round pick, and as of January 15, 2014, his draft stock was reported to be rising by a consensus of experts who had him pegged as a top-five pick. Manziel elected to throw during Texas A&M's Pro Day on March 27, 2014, instead of during the NFL Combine. During his pro day, Manziel completed 64 of 66 passes to six different receivers. His pro day performance was well received by sports journalists.

Prior to the 2014 NFL Draft, Manziel became one of the most polarizing athletes in pre-draft history, with scouting opinions varying from "undraftable" to "rare competitor". Former NFL head coach Barry Switzer took it to a personal level, criticizing Manziel, saying: "I don’t like his antics. I think he's an arrogant little prick. I’ve said that and I’ll say it again."

On draft day, 21 teams, including the Cleveland Browns, passed over Manziel. While Manziel was waiting to get drafted, he texted then-Browns quarterbacks coach Dowell Loggains that he wanted to "wreck the league" in Cleveland. Loggains forwarded the text to head coach Mike Pettine, who made the decision to trade up to draft Manziel. The Browns drafted him at the 22nd overall pick; at 5'11 3/4", he was the shortest quarterback drafted in the first round until Kyler Murray in 2019.

Cleveland Browns

2014 season

On August 22, 2014, Manziel was fined $12,000 by the NFL for a hand gesture (flipping the bird) that he made in a preseason loss to the Washington Redskins. Fellow quarterback Brian Hoyer was named the starter over Manziel for the opening regular-season game.

On November 30, 2014, Manziel entered the game against the Buffalo Bills during the fourth quarter after an ineffective performance by starting quarterback Brian Hoyer. Manziel went 5 of 8 for 63 yards, and scored his first NFL touchdown on a 10-yard rush in the fourth quarter. The Browns lost 26–10.

Manziel made his first NFL start in the Browns' Week 15 game against the Cincinnati Bengals. Manziel completed 10 of 18 passes for 80 yards and two interceptions for a 27.3 passer rating while being sacked three times. The Browns lost 30–0.

Manziel completed three of eight passes in his second career start against the Carolina Panthers on December 21, 2014. He left the game with a hamstring injury with less than two minutes remaining in the first half and was replaced by Hoyer. The Browns went on to lose 17–13.

Manziel was ruled out for the Browns' regular season finale against the Baltimore Ravens.

Overall, Manziel completed 18 of 35 passes for 176 yards and two interceptions, and rushed nine times for 29 yards and one touchdown. Manziel's work ethic and commitment were questioned by over 20 sources within the Cleveland Browns. An anonymous player even called Manziel's rookie season a "100 percent joke." Others within the organization were hopeful about Manziel's future, including cornerback Joe Haden.

2015 season

On August 27, Manziel was ruled out for the rest of the preseason with recurring pain in his right elbow. Manziel had been making noticeable improvement in his play.

On September 13, Manziel was brought into the game against the New York Jets after starting QB Josh McCown was injured in the first half. Manziel scored his first career passing touchdown with a 54-yard pass to WR Travis Benjamin. However, Manziel committed three turnovers in the second half (two of them being fumbles) as the Jets won 31–10. Manziel started the Week 2 game against 2014 Heisman Trophy winner Marcus Mariota and the Tennessee Titans. He completed 8 of 15 passes for 172 yards and two touchdowns to Benjamin in the 28–14 win.

Following McCown's recovery, Manziel did not take the field again until McCown suffered a shoulder injury in the fourth quarter of a Week 7 game against the St. Louis Rams. Manziel completed 4 of 5 passes for 27 yards in a 24–6 loss. In a Week 8 game against the Arizona Cardinals, Manziel again took the field in the fourth quarter after McCown suffered another injury. Manziel made his second start of the season in Week 9, completing 15 of 33 passes for 168 yards and one touchdown in a 31–10 loss to the Cincinnati Bengals. In Week 10, Manziel had his statistically best game against the Pittsburgh Steelers, completing 33 of 45 passes for 372 yards and one touchdown. Despite his efforts, however, the Browns lost 30–9.

Manziel was announced as the starting quarterback for the rest of the season on November 17. However, he was demoted to third-string quarterback behind McCown and Austin Davis a week later after videos surfaced of him partying in Texas over the bye week. As a result, Manziel remained benched in favor of Davis when McCown suffered a season-ending collarbone injury in the subsequent game against the Baltimore Ravens. Manziel was promoted to starter again after the Bengals defeated the Davis-led Browns 37–3. Despite throwing a maligned interception in his return performance, Manziel completed 21 of 31 passes for 270 yards and one touchdown in a 24–10 victory over the San Francisco 49ers, ending the Browns' seven-game losing streak.

Manziel sat out the last game of the 2015 season with a concussion, with reports circulating that he was in Las Vegas instead of in Cleveland with the team that weekend. The team confirmed that Manziel did miss a scheduled check-in on the morning of the last game of the season.

In early February 2016, NFL Network's Ian Rappaport and ESPN's Pat McManamon reported that the Browns planned to cut ties with Manziel as soon as the league's fiscal 2016 began. Earlier, following news that Manziel was being investigated for a domestic violence incident with his ex-girlfriend, the Browns released a statement saying that Manziel's continued disregard of their "expectations for our players on and off the field" had undermined the Browns' reputation, and that they intended to address his status "as soon as permitted by league rules." The Browns released him on March 11, 2016.

Hamilton Tiger-Cats

Negotiations
On March 31, 2017, the Canadian Football League's Hamilton Tiger-Cats revealed that they had placed Manziel on their negotiation list, a list of players that each team has exclusive rights to attempt to sign. The revelation was an unprecedented move, as CFL teams had previously kept their negotiation lists secret.

After a year out of football, Manziel had a workout in Buffalo, New York with the Tiger-Cats, during which he was "put through a series of physical and medical tests" from August 23 to 24, 2017. He did not initially sign with the team. On September 2, Manziel's representatives requested a contract offer from the Tiger-Cats. According to CFL rules, the Tiger-Cats then had 10 days to offer Manziel a contract, trade his rights or relinquish his rights. However, the CFL later extended the 10-day window so that the league could "facilitate a process of evaluation for the player." Manziel also had a meeting with CFL commissioner Randy Ambrosie in September. On September 27, the CFL announced that Manziel would not be allowed to sign with any CFL team for the 2017 season but would be able to sign with a team for the 2018 season if he met "certain conditions".

On December 28, 2017, the CFL approved Manziel to play in the league. The Tiger-Cats had until January 7 to offer him a contract or trade his rights. If neither was done, the team would lose his rights. On January 7, the team confirmed that they had made Manziel an offer. Not long after, Manziel's agent, Eric Burkhardt, responded to the Tiger-Cats offer stating that Hamilton had until January 31, 2018 to offer his client a "fair deal". Failure to do so would result in Manziel turning his attention to "several other professional options". Burkhardt insisted that Manziel be paid in the same realm as Tiger-Cats' quarterback Zach Collaros was the previous season; i.e., in the range of $500,000 to $550,000. The Tiger-Cats released a statement on February 14 implying they had broken off negotiations with Manziel. The same day, Manziel agreed to play in The Spring League, a non-paying developmental league, for the 2018 season. He was the quarterback at Texas A&M's 2018 pro day, throwing passes to potential 2018 NFL Draft prospects in front of representatives from all 32 NFL teams and the CFL. After the session, Manziel reiterated that his primary goal was to play in the NFL in 2018, but if that did not occur he would play in the CFL.

Signing and 2018 season
On May 19, 2018, Manziel and the Tiger-Cats announced that they had agreed to a two-year contract.

Montreal Alouettes
On July 22, after spending the first six weeks on Hamilton's bench without playing, as backup to Jeremiah Masoli, the Tiger-Cats traded Johnny Manziel and offensive linemen Tony Washington and Landon Rice to the Montreal Alouettes for defensive lineman Jamaal Westerman, wide receiver Chris Williams, and Montreal's 2020 and 2022 first round draft picks. Hamilton coach June Jones stated Manziel was traded to give him a better chance at receiving playing time, while the development of quarterback Dane Evans was also a factor in the trade. On July 31, Alouettes head coach Mike Sherman announced that Manziel would start their August 3 game against the Tiger-Cats, his former team. By halftime of his first CFL start Manziel had thrown four interceptions, including two to Jumal Rolle. Hamilton defeated Montreal 50–11. Manziel showed improvement and did not throw any interceptions in his second start, a 24–17 loss to the Ottawa Redblacks on August 11. In the third quarter, Manziel, after a 17-yard run, received a hard hit to the head from Ottawa's Jonathan Rose and fumbled the ball at the goal line, where the ball was recovered by Montreal's Kristian Matte for a touchdown. In the days following the game, Manziel missed practice and was placed in the CFL's concussion protocol. Manziel was placed on the injured list with Antonio Pipkin starting Montreal's next game at quarterback in Manziel's place. Pipkin started two games while Manziel recovered from his concussion, and then two additional games after Manziel had recovered.

Following a four interception game by Pipkin in Week 14, Manziel took over the reins as starting quarterback for the Alouettes in Week 15, a game they would end up losing 31–14 to the Winnipeg Blue Bombers. Manziel played in eight games in his first season in the CFL, completing 106 of 165 pass attempts (64.2%) for 1,290 yards with five touchdowns and seven interceptions. He also rushed the ball 29 times for 215 yards. Manziel was said to have struggled during his first season at the CFL, and NBC Sports writer Michael David Smith said it "wasn't great", despite Manziel's satisfaction with how he played. Manziel's performance throughout the season gradually improved, and was attributed to his becoming accustomed to CFL rules.

Manziel was slated to compete with Pipkin and Vernon Adams for the starting role in 2019, but on February 27 it was revealed that the Alouettes released him on orders from the CFL after league officials determined that he had "contravened" the terms of his CFL contract. The CFL also barred him from signing with any other CFL team. Manziel had previously revealed that as part of his agreement with the league, he was required to see a doctor, attend weekly sessions with a therapist, and submit to weekly lithium tests. According to veteran CFL journalist Justin Dunk, the league decided to cut ties with Manziel after he missed a number of mandatory meetings.

Memphis Express
On March 16, 2019, Manziel signed an agreement to join the Alliance of American Football. Under the league's regional allocation process, the San Antonio Commanders had the first opportunity to sign him via his Texas A&M connections, but the Commanders elected to waive his rights. As a result, he was assigned to the 1–5 Memphis Express through the waiver system, as the Express needed a quarterback to replace the injured Zach Mettenberger and the struggling Christian Hackenberg.

Manziel made his debut against the Birmingham Iron on March 24, playing three drives in the second and third quarters as a backup to Brandon Silvers. He completed three of five passes for 48 yards, along with running for 20 yards as the Express won 31–25. The next week, in a March 30 game against the Orlando Apollos, Manziel was removed from the game due to a concussion suffered while attempting to make a tackle after throwing an interception. Three days later, the AAF suspended football operations, ending the 2019 season.

Fan Controlled Football
When asked by TMZ in September 2020 about potentially playing in the XFL, Manziel announced his retirement, stating: "I think football is a little bit behind me … Football for me is not at the forefront of my mind." He did not completely rule out coming out of retirement, praising incoming co-owner Dwayne Johnson and stating "Listen, anything ‘The Rock’ touches is gonna be gold as always."

On December 30, 2020, Manziel signed with Fan Controlled Football, an indoor American football league. He was assigned to the Zappers, a team co-owned by his friend, Bob Menery. In a February 2021 USA Today interview, Manziel stated he joined the league out of boredom, and expressed disinterest in playing any more professional football in the future.

Manziel played sparingly for the Zappers and missed the week 3 game due to a dental emergency. He was pulled from the semifinal playoff matchup, a game that featured him reuniting with former Browns teammate Josh Gordon, for poor performance.

On March 25, 2022, Manziel announced he would return to FCF for a second season, noting that he will serve as a player-coach for the 2022 season and that the league did not pressure him to be the face of the league.

Career statistics

Professional

Honors and accomplishments

College honors

Full-season awards
 2012 Heisman Trophy winner (first freshman to win)
 2012 Davey O'Brien National Quarterback Award winner (first freshman to win)
 2012 Manning Award winner (first freshman to win)
 2012 First-team All-American by:
◦ Associated Press
◦ Football Writers Association of America
◦ Walter Camp Football Foundation
◦ Sporting News
◦ ESPN
◦ CBS Sports
◦ Scout.com
◦ Sports Illustrated
 2012 Sporting News College Football Player of the Year
 2012 SEC Offensive Player of the Year
 2012 SEC Freshman of the Year
 2012 All-SEC First-team Quarterback
 2013 Cotton Bowl Classic – Offensive MVP
 2012 ESPN.com All-Bowl Team
 2013 SEC Male Athlete of the Year
 2013 Chick-fil-A Bowl – Offensive MVP

Weekly awards
 2-time Walter Camp National Offensive Player of the Week
 3-time AT&T All-America Player of the Week
 4-time SEC Offensive Player of the Week
 9-time SEC Freshman of the Week

NCAA records and notes
 FBS freshman record: rushing yards by a quarterback, season (1,410)
 FBS freshman record: total offense, season (5,116)
 10th-most (at the time) single-season total offensive yards in NCAA FBS history
 Most games with 300 or more passing yards and 100+ rushing yards, career (4)
 FBS record: First freshman (and fifth player ever) in FBS history with 3,000 passing yards and 1,000 rushing yards, season
 FBS record: Rushing yards by a quarterback in a bowl game (229 yards)
 Only the fourth player to have 20 passing TDs and 20 rushing TDs, season
 Eclipsed the 7,000-yard barrier in total offense in his 19th career game, which is the fastest in NCAA FBS history by a four-year player
 Second freshman in FBS history to rush for 1,000 yards and pass for 2,000 yards
 First freshman to win the Heisman Trophy
 First freshman to win the Davey O'Brien National Quarterback Award
 First freshman to win the Manning Award

SEC records and notes
 Most yards total offense in a game (576, breaking Archie Manning's 1969 record of 540 yards)
 The first three places on the SEC total offense in a game
 576 yards
 562 yards against No. 1 Alabama
 557 yards two weeks before the 576 yards
 Most yards total offense, season (5,116, breaking Cam Newton's 2010 record in two fewer games)
 2nd-most yards total offense, season (4,873)
 Most yards total offense, game average (383.3, breaking Tim Couch's 1998 record, of 377.4 yards)
 Highest yards per play average (50 plays minimum), game (10.71, against Arkansas on September 29, 2012, breaking Steve Tanneyhill's record of 10.0 yards)
 First SEC quarterback to pass for 3,000 yards and rush for 1,000 yards in one season
 Second-most passing yards in a SEC single season, 4,114 passing yards
 Tied for third-most passing touchdowns in an SEC single season, 37 touchdowns
 Tied for second most rushing touchdowns in a single season
 Tied for 8th most scoring in a single season
 8th most passing yards in a single season

Texas A&M records and notes
 Most total yards in a season with 5,116
 Most yards passing yards in a game
 The first three spots on the Texas A&M passing yards in a game
 464 yards against No. 1 Alabama on September 14, 2013
 454 yards against Auburn on October 19, 2013
 453 yards against Arkansas on September 29, 2012
 Most yards total offense in a game (576, breaking Archie Manning's 1969 record of 540 yards)
 The first 3 spots on the Texas A&M total offense in a game
 576 yards
 562 yards against No. 1 Alabama
 557 yards two weeks before the 576 yards
 In 10 games, Manziel had 4 of the top 10 games in total offense in Texas A&M history.
 Logged 10 straight games with 300 or more total yards, 21 total games with 300+ yards.
 Third Texas A&M quarterback to surpass 3,000 passing yards in a season.
 First Texas A&M quarterback to have multiple 3,000-yard seasons.
 Texas A&M career total touchdowns record with 94 touchdowns.
 Texas A&M career total yards record with 9,989 yards.
 Third Texas A&M quarterback to surpass 7,000 passing yards in a career.
 Most passing yards in a single season.
 Second Texas A&M quarterback to rush for 2,000 yards.
 The most rushing touchdowns in a single season.
 The most passing touchdowns in a single season.
 2nd in career passing touchdowns.
 2nd in career passing yards.
 Tied for 12th in career rushing touchdowns.
 15th in career rushing yards.

Cleveland Browns records
Cleveland Browns franchise record for most rushing yards by a QB in a single game (108).

Controversies

June 2012 arrest
On June 29, 2012—before he was chosen as Texas A&M's starting quarterback and before his first college game—Manziel was arrested and charged with three misdemeanors—disorderly conduct, failure to produce identification, and possession of a fictitious driver's license. These charges stemmed from a late-night fight in College Station, Texas. In July 2013, he pleaded guilty to failure to produce identification, and the other two charges were dismissed.

Police reports stated that Manziel was with a friend who directed a racial slur at a man on the street. The man then approached the two of them and tried to get at the friend, but Manziel placed himself between the two men, saying his friend didn't mean it and he was going to take him home. The man continued pushing against Manziel to reach the other man, and Manziel eventually pushed back. At this point, the man swung at Manziel who then began fighting back. Shortly afterwards, the bicycle patrol officers arrived. Manziel was 19 at the time, and he presented to police officers a fake Louisiana driver's license that showed him to be 21 years of age. Manziel was taken into custody and reportedly spent the night in jail. After the incident, Manziel eventually regained the favor of his team and head coach Kevin Sumlin, and was named the starting quarterback. Sumlin's policy precluded freshmen from giving media interviews, and Manziel was unable to speak to reporters about his arrest until the end of the 2012 regular season. When reporters asked about the incident during his first press conference on November 27, Manziel stated that he had learned from the mistake and "had to make a lot of changes in [his] life."

2013 offseason
During the 2013 offseason at Texas A&M, Manziel drew significant media attention over his behavior off the field. Notable incidents include his early departure from the Manning Passing Academy after allegedly oversleeping, tweeting that he "can't wait to leave College Station" after receiving a parking ticket, and getting kicked out of a University of Texas fraternity party. An ESPN The Magazine article revealed his parents' concerns about his dealings with his newfound stardom.

On August 4, ESPN reported that the NCAA was investigating whether Manziel accepted payments for autographs that he had signed in January 2013. The NCAA did not find any evidence that Manziel accepted money for the autographs, but reached an agreement with Texas A&M to suspend him for the first half of the season opener against Rice University, due to an "inadvertent violation" of NCAA rules.

2015 offseason
On February 4, Manziel entered a treatment program for unspecified reasons.

On May 30, Manziel was involved in an incident with a heckler at the AT&T Byron Nelson golf tournament. The heckler had been continually asking for an autograph, to the point that Manziel became fed up and threw a water bottle at the man. The water bottle missed the heckler. Security and police were called, but no criminal charges were filed.

2015 season
During October of the 2015 season, Manziel was pulled over by a policeman after fighting in his car with his then girlfriend, Colleen Crowley. Although no charges were made, Manziel admitted to having had some alcoholic drinks earlier that afternoon.

On November 24, a week after Manziel was announced as the Browns' starter for the remainder of the season, head coach Mike Pettine demoted Manziel to third string after a video of him partying surfaced on the Internet. It was later revealed Manziel reportedly lied about the video.

On January 2, 2016, Manziel was seen at Las Vegas' Planet Hollywood casino the night before the Browns played their final game of the 2015 season. Manziel was scratched from the final game because of a concussion. As word of his appearance at the casino spread across social media, he posted a photo on Instagram of himself and his dog at home. The next day, Manziel failed to report to the Browns on Sunday morning when he was supposed to report to the team medic, which all players with concussions are supposed to do. Sports Illustrated's Peter King also added that the Browns are "so done with Manziel" and he "wants to go to Dallas."

2016

On January 6, 2016, Manziel's marketing agency, LRMR, announced that it would no longer work with Manziel. Manziel's agent, Erik Burkhardt, also announced that he would no longer represent Manziel. On February 5, 2016, the Dallas Police Department announced that they are opening a criminal investigation with a claim of domestic violence involving his ex-girlfriend, Colleen Crowley. Dallas police had originally closed the case, but re-opened it with allegations stemming from an altercation on January 30, 2016, at a downtown Dallas hotel. According to Crowley, Manziel forced her into a car, pulled her by the hair, and threatened to kill both her and himself. According to ESPN and NFL Network, this incident was the last straw for the Browns, and was a factor in their decision to cut ties with him. On April 24, Manziel was indicted by a Dallas grand jury on misdemeanor assault charges for the incident.

On April 19, 2016, after just two months of representing him, agent Drew Rosenhaus terminated Manziel as a client, marking the first time in Rosenhaus' 27-year career he terminated his relationship with an NFL player. On the same day, Nike ended its sponsorship with Manziel.

On June 24, 2016, Manziel's attorney, Bob Hinton, accidentally sent a lengthy text message to the Associated Press relating to Manziel's defense in his domestic violence case. In the message, Hinton expressed concerns about Manziel's ability to stay clean, saying that he was given a receipt that suggests Manziel spent around $1,000 at The Gas Pipe, a drug paraphernalia store. On the same day, Manziel's father, Paul, told ESPN: "He's a druggie. It's not a secret that he's a druggie. Hopefully, he doesn't die before he comes to his senses. I mean, I hate to say it, but I hope he goes to jail. I mean, that would be the best place for him. I'm doing my job, and I'm going to move on. If I have to bury him, I'll bury him."

On June 30, 2016, he was suspended for the first four games of the 2016 season for violating the NFL's substance abuse policy. On September 5, Manziel returned to his alma mater to take classes.

On December 2, 2016, Manziel and prosecutors finalized a plea agreement in which Manziel agreed to undergo counseling and have his conduct monitored by prosecutors for up to a year or face prosecution.

Personal life
Manziel is a friend of rap artist Drake and in April 2014, Drake released a track entitled "Draft Day", which includes a shoutout to Manziel.

On March 10, 2017, Manziel became engaged to Bre Tiesi; the two were married in a private ceremony in March 2018. Their divorce was finalized in November 2021.

In a February 2018 interview, Manziel recounted his personal problems, and has stated that he had been diagnosed with bipolar disorder.

See also
 List of NCAA major college football yearly total offense leaders

Notes

References

External links

 Texas A&M profile
 
 
 

1992 births
All-American college football players
American Christians
American football quarterbacks
American people of Italian descent
American people of Lebanese descent
American players of Canadian football
Canadian football quarterbacks
Cleveland Browns players
Hamilton Tiger-Cats players
Heisman Trophy winners
Living people
Memphis Express (American football) players
Montreal Alouettes players
People from Kerrville, Texas
People with bipolar disorder
Players of American football from Texas
Sportspeople from Tyler, Texas
Texas A&M Aggies football players
The Spring League players
Fan Controlled Football players
Sportspeople of Lebanese descent